Swansea Cork Ferries was a company that operated a RoRo service between Swansea and Cork (Ringaskiddy) from 1987 till 2006. The company no longer offers a ferry service but provides consultancy services. Its former owners Strintzis Lines are now part of the Attica Group, and Briarstar Ltd was dissolved in 2012. The company remains in the ownership of Thomas Hunter Mc Gowan.

A Swansea–Cork ferry service was restarted by Fastnet Line in March 2010, but services were suspended in November 2011 due to the economic situation.

History
1987 - Swansea Cork Ferries formed following B&I Line's withdrawal from the route four years earlier.
1992 - Sold to Greek shipping company Strintzis Lines.
1999 - Swansea Cork Ferries sold to an Irish business consortium.
2006 - Superferry operates last sailing on 7 October.

Fleet
Swansea Cork Ferries operated four ships during its 20 years in operation.

References

Defunct shipping companies of the United Kingdom